Edison State College, now Florida SouthWestern State College, is a college in Fort Myers, Florida.

Edison State College may also refer to:
Thomas Edison State College in Trenton, New Jersey
Edison Community College in Piqua, Ohio